Eremophila appressa, commonly known as wispy poverty bush, is a plant in the figwort family, Scrophulariaceae and is endemic to two remote locations in the central west of Western Australia.

Description
It has thin, glabrous, sticky branches. The leaves are glued to the stems until they age when they spread slightly.

The petals are pink to purplish with deep red spots. The inside and outside of the tube as well as the outer sides of the petal lobes are hairy. There are four stamens which do not extend beyond the end of the tube.

Taxonomy and naming
The species was first formally described by Robert Chinnock in 2007 and the description was published in Eremophila and allied genera : a monograph of the plant family Myoporaceae. The specific epithet (appressa) refers to the leaves being pressed against the stems.

Distribution and habitat
Eremophila appressa grows in red ironstone soils between Kumarina and Newman in the Gascoyne and Pilbara biogeographic regions. It grows on rocky slopes in gravelly soil.

Conservation status
Eremophila appressa is classified as "Priority One" by the Government of Western Australia Department of Parks and Wildlife meaning that it is known from only one or a few locations which are potentially at risk.

References

appressa
Eudicots of Western Australia
Plants described in 2007
Endemic flora of Western Australia
anomala